Sharon Hill is a borough in Delaware County, Pennsylvania, United States. The population was 5,697 at the 2010 census. Currently the population stands at 6,356 residents.

Government 
The government of Sharon Hill operates under the Pennsylvania State Borough Code. The day-to-day operations of the borough are exercised through the borough manager,  Ieasa Nichols. The mayor is Hykeem Green. The borough has seven councilmembers.

Geography
Sharon Hill is located in eastern Delaware County at  (39.906340, -75.271008). It is bordered to the west by Folcroft, to the north by Collingdale and Darby, to the east by Colwyn, and to the south by Darby Township. 

Demographics

As of Census 2010, the racial makeup of the borough was 32.6% White, 60.6% African American, 0.3% Native American, 2.1% Asian, 0.7% from other races, and 3.7% from two or more races. Hispanic or Latino of any race were 3.2% of the population .

As of the census of 2000, there were 5,697 people, 2,186 households, and 1,390 families residing in the borough. The population density was 7,379.5 people per square mile (2,777.9/km2). There were 2,265 housing units at an average density of 2,954.0 per square mile (1,141.0/km2). The racial makeup of the borough was 32.6% White, 60.6% African American, 0.3% Native American, 2.1% Asian, 0.00% Pacific Islander, 0.0% from other races, and 3.7% from two or more races. Hispanic or Latino of any race were 3.2% of the population.

There were 2,091 households, out of which 34.0% had children under the age of 18 living with them, 42.7% were married couples living together, 17.4% had a female householder with no husband present, and 33.5% were non-families. 28.7% of all households were made up of individuals, and 10.9% had someone living alone who was 65 years of age or older. The average household size was 2.61 and the average family size was 3.24.

In the borough the population was spread out, with 27.9% under the age of 18, 8.3% from 18 to 24, 31.3% from 25 to 44, 19.9% from 45 to 64, and 12.7% who were 65 years of age or older. The median age was 36 years. For every 100 females there were 89.9 males. For every 100 females age 18 and over, there were 84.3 males.

The median income for a household in the borough was $42,436, and the median income for a family was $48,146. Males had a median income of $37,500 versus $29,049 for females. The per capita income for the borough was $18,503. About 10.6% of families and 11.0% of the population were below the poverty line, including 17.8% of those under age 18 and 3.2% of those age 65 or over.

Education 
Students are in the Southeast Delco School District. K-8 school residents in Sharon Hill are zoned to Sharon Hill School. All residents of the school district are zoned to Academy Park High School.

Until 2003, Catholic school students attended Holy Spirit School. This school has since closed due to lack of enrollment. Another Catholic school, Holy Child Academy, closed in 1973.

Delaware County Community College operates the Southeast Center in the Folcroft East Business Park.

Religion
The Roman Catholic Archdiocese of Philadelphia operates Catholic churches. Established in 1892, Holy Spirit Church closed in 2015, consolidating into St. George Church in Glenolden.

Notable people

Rodney Blake - Professional basketball player
William Clothier, 1906 U.S. Open champion inducted in International Tennis Hall of Fame
Bert Cooper - professional boxer
Bill Cubit - College football coach
Cardinal John Patrick Foley - Member of the College of Cardinals
William H. Milliken, Jr., U.S. Congressman for Pennsylvania's 7th congressional district from 1959 to 1965
Bessie Smith - Blues singer is buried at Mount Lawn Cemetery in Sharon Hill. Her grave remained unmarked until August 7, 1970, when a tombstone—paid for by singer Janis Joplin and Juanita Green, who as a child had done housework for Smith—was erected.
Jalen Duren - NBA Basketball player born in Sharon Hill and lived there until 7th grade when he moved to Delaware.

Transportation

U.S. Route 13 (Chester Pike) is the main road through the borough, leading northeast  to Center City Philadelphia and southwest  to Chester.

Sharon Hill is connected to the 69th Street Transportation Center in Upper Darby by the SEPTA 102 trolley at its Sharon Hill terminus. Curtis Park Station and Sharon Hill Station are SEPTA train stations on the Wilmington/Newark Regional Rail line.

References

External links

 

Populated places established in 1890
Boroughs in Delaware County, Pennsylvania